Ecballogonia is a genus of moth in the family Cosmopterigidae. It contains only one species, Ecballogonia bimetallica, which is found in Mexico.

References

External links
Natural History Museum Lepidoptera genus database

Cosmopteriginae